Matankari is a town in southwestern Niger. It is near the city of Niamey.

Communes of Niger